Bindal River (also Bindal Rao) flows through Dehradun in Uttarakhand, India, and is fed by a number of springs at the base of Mussoorie ridge.

Due to unchecked development around the river and encroachment at many places, the river water has been contaminated with hazardous pollutants and chemicals. In 2019, the government of Uttarakhand initiated a plan to revive the water body.

References

Rivers of Uttarakhand
Geography of Dehradun
Dehradun district
Rivers of India